"The Inner Circle" is the twenty-third episode of the seventh season of the American comedy television series The Office and the show's 149th episode overall. The episode originally aired on May 5, 2011, on NBC. The episode also marked Will Ferrell's final appearance as Deangelo, having signed up for four episodes. Cody Horn also makes her first guest appearance for the series as Jordan Garfield.

The series depicts the everyday lives of office employees in the Scranton, Pennsylvania branch of the fictional Dunder Mifflin Paper Company. In this episode, new office manager Deangelo begins picking favorites among the staff, revealing his true management style. After he only picks men to join his "inner circle", many of the female staffers begin to believe he is sexist.

The episode was written by Charlie Grandy and directed by Matt Sohn. The episode marks the first episode since Steve Carell left the series as a series regular. "The Inner Circle" received mixed reviews from critics, with many commenting on Ferrell's performance, with opinions ranging from positive to negative. According to Nielsen Media Research, the episode was viewed by an estimated 6.90 million households and received a 3.5 Nielsen rating and 10% share among adults between the ages of 18 and 49 marking a drop in the ratings from the previous episode, "Goodbye, Michael".

Synopsis
New office manager Deangelo Vickers (Will Ferrell) picks favorites among the staff, including Kevin Malone (Brian Baumgartner), Jim Halpert (John Krasinski), a sycophantic Gabe Lewis (Zach Woods), and Darryl Philbin (Craig Robinson), who is attending business school thanks to Deangelo. He is also favorable towards Ryan Howard (B. J. Novak), who he believes is the head of the customer service department and Kelly Kapoor's (Mindy Kaling) direct supervisor. Kelly is initially irate at the situation, but Ryan agrees to be a more dutiful boyfriend in exchange for Kelly keeping up the charade. Andy Bernard (Ed Helms) desperately aspires to join the inner circle, while Deangelo repeatedly attempts to win over Dwight Schrute (Rainn Wilson), who is still apathetic toward the new boss. Angela Martin (Angela Kinsey) sees his style as sexist, as every member of the inner circle is male, which Pam Halpert (Jenna Fischer) agrees to, as Deangelo has repeatedly been acting coldly towards her; they persuade Jim to talk to Deangelo about it. To prove to the staff that he's not sexist, Deangelo hires a woman named Jordan Garfield (Cody Horn), who turns out to have no business experience (having previously worked at Anthropologie) over other qualified candidates, including a friend of Pam's. Kelly later attempts to tell Deangelo the truth about Ryan's actual position as a temp worker, but Deangelo simply appoints Ryan as the department head rather than figuring out the truth.

Jim is kicked out of the inner circle after pointing out what the women of the office had said, and an enthusiastic Andy replaces him (despite having previously denounced Deangelo after deciding that he was sexist). Pam interrupts a mock basketball session the inner circle is having in the office in order to quiet it down, and an annoyed Deangelo reinvites Jim back into the circle. Jim instead challenges him to try a real dunk, which Deangelo claims he can do, at the warehouse basketball hoop downstairs. Deangelo brings everyone down to the warehouse, including Dwight, who Deangelo finally loses his temper with and directly orders him downstairs or be fired (ironically earning Dwight's respect, as he "respond[s] to strong leadership"). Deangelo then attempts to dunk from the free-throw line, only to severely injure himself by crashing down with the basketball stand on top of him. He is immediately taken to the hospital, leaving Dunder Mifflin Scranton without a manager.

At the end of the episode, Deangelo makes it back to the office, still in his hospital gown, with an IV tube trailing from his arm. His attempts to tell a bar joke come out as random gibberish. Gabe and Jim lead him out of the office after Erin Hannon (Ellie Kemper) calls for an ambulance.

Production

The episode was written by supervising producer Charlie Grandy, his sixth writing credit of the series. It was directed by the series' cinematographer Matt Sohn, his second directing credit of the series. This is the first episode of The Office without former lead actor Steve Carell as Michael Scott. The feeling during filming was initially "weird", but the mood eventually changed to "very hopeful, excited and anticipatory feeling" according to Office showrunner Paul Lieberstein. The episode marked the final appearance in Will Ferrell's four-episode arc on the series after first appearing in "Training Day". The episode is also the first appearance of Cody Horn as Jordan Garfield, Deangelo's executive assistant, and the first of three new roles since Carell's departure. The role was originally said to be recurring at first with a chance of her becoming a series regular. She eventually did not return for the eighth season. In the final scene, Krasinski can be seen breaking character and putting his head down.

The official website for The Office included three cut scenes from "The Inner Circle" within a week of its release. In the first 38 second clip, Deangelo invites Dwight on a weekend trip to a Los Lobos concert which Dwight declines once he learns he can't drive the bus. In a talking head, Dwight reveals that Deangelo makes his skin crawl. In the second 144 second clip, Andy tries to become Deangelo's new executive assistant while in a talking head Pam decides to give up trying to impress Deangelo. It is also revealed in the same talking head that Michael named his new dog after Pam. In the third 82 second clip, Jim attempts to get back into the inner circle.

Reception

Ratings
In its original American broadcast on May 5, 2011, "The Inner Circle" was viewed by an estimated 6.90 million households and received a 3.5 rating/10% share among adults between the ages of 18 and 49. This means that it was seen by 3.5% of all 18- to 49-year-olds, and 10% of all 18- to 49-year-olds watching television at the time of the broadcast. This marked a 17% drop in the ratings from the previous episode, "Goodbye, Michael", but marked a rise from the last regular episode, "Michael's Last Dundies". The episode tied for first in its timeslot beating Bones which received a 3.2 rating/9% share in the 18–49 demographic, CSI: Crime Scene Investigation which received a 2.3 rating/6% share and Nikita which received a 0.8 rating/2% share. The episode also tied for first in its timeslot with Grey's Anatomy. "The Inner Circle" was the fifth most-watched scripted show for the week of broadcast among adults aged 18–49.

Reviews

The episode received mixed reviews from critics. The A.V. Club writer Myles McNutt compared the episode to "Training Day" commenting that The Inner Circle' is more successful than that episode ['Training Day'] on some levels", but "both episodes suffer from the same problem: They’re simply not very funny or meaningful, which I'd argue is even more problematic for "The Inner Circle" given its position in the season." He ultimately gave the episode a C−. TV Squad writer Joel Keller wrote that while "the episode did have its funny moments", "overall, you can just feel that the show has changed in a very fundamental way". Alan Sepinwall of HitFix criticized the writers for still not finding Deangelo's character out commenting that "the fact that the writers so clearly had no idea what to do with Ferrell doesn't fill me with confidence for whatever guest stars turn up in the final episodes – nor do I feel especially great right now about the idea of an outside character coming in as the permanent new regional manager."

IGN reviewer Cindy White praised the writing for Deangelo's character saying that "Ferrell is much better carrying the show on his own than being second banana to Carell. It seemed like he was having more fun with the role in this episode". She ultimately gave the episode a 7.0/10. New Yorks Phoebe Reilly wrote that "while it was nice to see the staff responding to someone new, it didn't feel like enough to make an audience antsy to come back after a long summer." Hillary Busis of Entertainment Weekly also gave the episode a mediocre review commenting that "judging by tonight's episode alone, the transition from the Carell era to the post-Carell era is going to be shaky, to say the least". "The Inner Circle" was voted the fourth lowest-rated episode out of 24 from the seventh season, according to an episode poll at the fansite OfficeTally. In another poll, the episode was voted the third lowest-rated episode out of 24 from the seventh season and was rated 6.86 out of 10.

References

External links
 "The Inner Circle" at NBC.com
 

The Office (American season 7) episodes
2011 American television episodes